Euchrysops is a genus of Afrotropical butterfly in the family Lycaenidae.

Species
Euchrysops abyssinica (Aurivillius, 1922)
Euchrysops alberta (Butler, 1901)
Euchrysops albistriatus (Capronnier, 1889)
Euchrysops banyo Libert, 2001
Euchrysops barkeri (Trimen, 1893)
Euchrysops brunneus Bethune-Baker, 1923
Euchrysops cnejus (Fabricius, 1798)
Euchrysops crawshayi (Butler, 1899)
Euchrysops cyclopteris (Butler, 1876)
Euchrysops decaryi Stempffer, 1947
Euchrysops dolorosa (Trimen & Bowker, 1887)
Euchrysops jacksoni Stempffer, 1952
Euchrysops horus (Stoneham, 1938)
Euchrysops kabrosae (Bethune-Baker, 1906)
Euchrysops katangae Bethune-Baker, 1923
Euchrysops lois (Butler, 1886)
Euchrysops malathana (Boisduval, 1833)
Euchrysops mauensis Bethune-Baker, 1923
Euchrysops migiurtiniensis Stempffer, 1946
Euchrysops nandensis (Neave, 1904)
Euchrysops nilotica (Aurivillius, 1904)
Euchrysops osiris (Hopffer, 1855)
Euchrysops philbyi Gabriel, 1954
Euchrysops reducta Hulstaert, 1924
Euchrysops sagba Libert, 1993
Euchrysops sahelianus Libert, 2001
Euchrysops severini Hulstaert, 1924
Euchrysops subpallida Bethune-Baker, 1923
Euchrysops unigemmata (Butler, 1895)

Doubtful status
Euchrysops leucyanea (Hewitson)

External links
Euchrysops at funet
Seitz, A. Die Gross-Schmetterlinge der Erde 13: Die Afrikanischen Tagfalter. Plate XIII 73 et seq.

 
Lycaenidae genera